The Peugeot 20Cup is a reverse trike concept car using the "tadpole" set-up, built in 2005.  
Made from a carbon-fibre structure, it integrated a two-seater cockpit and a front end from the Peugeot 207 with a motorcycle rear.

Engine

The purpose-built 1.6 litre engine was manufactured in a collaboration between BMW and PSA. The turbo-charged, four-cylinder, sixteen valve petrol engine generates a maximum power of

Design

The reverse-trike design, also known as the "tadpole" format

References

20Cup